Jagannath Thapaliya (Nepali: जगन्नाथ थपलिया) is Nepalese politician and member of the Bagmati Provincial Assembly. He was elected parliamentary party leader of CPN (UML), the second largest party in the Bagmati Provincial Assembly, on 29 December 2022. He is currently serving as Minister for Economic Affairs and Planning of Bagmati Province.

References

Living people
Nepalese politicians
Members of the Provincial Assembly of Bagmati Province
Year of birth missing (living people)